Anse Rodrigue is a quartier of Terre-de-Haut Island, located in Îles des Saintes archipelago in the Caribbean. It is located in the eastern part of the island. It is built around a white sand beach called Anse Rodrigue and between Two mounts called Morne à Craie and Morne Fourmi.

Populated places in Îles des Saintes
Quartiers of Îles des Saintes